Guy Peverly was an American football coach.  He served as the third head football coach at Fairmount College—now known as Wichita State University—in Wichita, Kansas and he held that position for the 1902 season.  His  record at Fairmount was 4–3–1.

Head coaching record

References

Year of birth missing
Year of death missing
Wichita State Shockers football coaches